Femarelle is a dietary supplement that is a mixture of DT56a (a tofu extract) and flaxseed powder, that may act as a selective estrogen receptor modulator (SERM). In 2008 an application was submitted to the European Food Safety Authority to market Femarelle with a health claim, namely that it can reduce the risk for osteoporosis and other bone disorders; the EFSA found that "the food/constituent for which the claim is made, i.e. Femarelle, has not been sufficiently characterised" and that " a cause and effect relationship has not been established between the consumption of Femarelle and increased BMD, increased bone formation, or decreased risk of osteoporosis or other bone disorders in post-menopausal women."

Femarelle has been tested in small clinical trials.  One studied its effect on the tissue lining the vagina, another on relief of hot flashes in menopause, and another on the risk of causing blood clots, which is a risk of hormone replacement therapy.  While results were promising, the studies were too small and too short in duration from which to draw conclusions.

See also
 Menerba
 Rimostil

References

Botanical drugs
Dietary supplements
Herbalism
Phytoestrogens
Selective estrogen receptor modulators